The 2017 European Youth Weightlifting Championships took place in Palace of Youth and Sports, Pristina, Kosovo from 23 September to 30 September 2017.

Team ranking

Boys Under-15

Girls Under-15

Boys Youth

Girls Youth

Medal overview

Under-15

Boys

Girls

Youth (Under-17)

Boys

Girls

Medal table
Ranking by Big (Total result) medals
 

Ranking by all medals: Big (Total result) and Small (Snatch and Clean & Jerk)

References 

European Youth Championships
Weightlifting Championships,European
2017 in Kosovan sport
Sports competitions in Pristina
September 2017 sports events in Europe
Youth Championships,2017
2017,Weightlifting,Youth,European Championships